Isaac Albert Arthur (born September 20, 1980) is a science communication, YouTuber and futurist. He is best known as producer of his YouTube channel, Science & Futurism With Isaac Arthur (SFIA), where he discusses a broad variety of topics on futurism and space colonization.

Early life and education
Arthur was raised by his mother and his grandfather, Alan Arthur, along with an older sister. He was homeschooled from the age of ten, and dropped out of high school at age twelve. He received his GED at the age of sixteen.

In 2001 he graduated at the top of his class with a degree in physics from Kent State University and began to pursue a graduate degree in biophysics. Arthur became involved in local politics and now serves as chairman of the Ashtabula County board of elections. His wife, Sarah Fowler Arthur has represented Ohio's 99th district in the Ohio state legislature since 2021.

Science & Futurism with Isaac Arthur

Arthur began the educational YouTube channel Science & Futurism with Isaac Arthur in 2012.  In September 2014, he released the first video on the channel on the topic of megastructures.  As of March 7 2023 the channel has over  subscribers and  videos.  He contributed to the United States Air Force Academy’s simultaneous transition to remote education during the COVID-19 pandemic and the launch of the graduation of USAFA cadets into the United States Space Force by joining USAFA’s Space Policy course as a visiting lecturer.

Arthur continues to serve as a board member of his hometown's Board of Elections by day, spending the majority of his personal time working on the production of his videos.  Following the success of his channel, Arthur collaborates with other science communicators, including Paul Sutter and Fraser Cain, and acts as an analyst and consultant for science fiction novels and games, such as HADES 9.  His channel is dedicated to topics including space colonization in the near and far future, futurism, artificial intelligence, and transhumanism, among others, especially in the context of thermodynamics, economics, science fiction, the Fermi paradox, and the Dyson dilemma.  The channel's main focus is to speculate on how humanity or other hypothetical advanced civilizations may behave logistically, technologically, and socially, in the near and distant future under the laws of known science.

The channel releases new episodes every Thursday, which tend to be around thirty minutes in length and are roughly organized into series:

 Advanced Civilizations
 Alien Civilizations
 Post Scarcity Civilizations
 Civilizations at the End of Time
 Cyborgs, Androids, Transhumanism & AI
 Fermi Paradox
 Interstellar Warfare
 Megastructures
 Upward Bound
 Outward Bound

Arthur also collaborates with other YouTubers and science communicators.

National Space Society

In 2020, Arthur was named the recipient of the National Space Society's Space Pioneer Award for Education via Mass Media for his YouTube channel.

On March 1st, 2023, Arthur was elected President of the National Space Society.

See also 
 John Michael Godier

References

External links
 Official website
 YouTube channel

1980 births
Living people
American transhumanists
YouTubers from California
Kent State University alumni
Science communicators